Eualetes is a genus of sea snails, marine gastropod mollusks in the family Vermetidae, the worm snails or worm shells.

Species
Species within the genus Eualetes include:
 Eualetes centiquadrus (Valenciennes, 1846)
 Eualetes tulipa (Chenu, 1843)
Species brought into synonymy
 Eualetes tulipa (Chenu, 1843): synonym of Eualetes tulipa (Rousseau in Chenu, 1843)

References

  Keen, A.M. (1971). Two new supraspecific taxa in the Gastropoda. The Veliger, 13(3): 296 page(s): 296

Vermetidae